Voice leading (or part writing) is the linear progression of individual melodic lines (voices or parts) and their interaction with one another to create harmonies, typically in accordance with the principles of common-practice harmony and counterpoint.

Rigorous concern for voice leading is of greatest importance in common-practice music, although jazz and pop music also demonstrate attention to voice leading to varying degrees. In Jazz Theory, Gabriel Sakuma writes that "[a]t the surface level, jazz voice-leading conventions seem more relaxed than they are in common-practice music." Marc Schonbrun also states that while it is untrue that "popular music has no voice leading in it, [...] the largest amount of popular music is simply conceived with chords as blocks of information, and melodies are layered on top of the chords."

Example
The score below shows the first four measures of the C-major prelude from J.S. Bach's The Well-Tempered Clavier, Book 1. Letter (a) presents the original score while (b) and (c) present reductions (simplified versions) intended to clarify the harmony and implied voice leading, respectively.

In (b), the same measures are presented as four block chords (with two inverted): I – II – V – I.

In (c), the four measures are presented as five horizontal voices identified by the direction of the stems (which are added even though the notes are actually whole notes). Notice that each voice consists of just three notes: from top to bottom, (1) E F — E; (2) C D — C; (3) G A G —; (4) E D — E; (5) C — B C. The four chords result from the fact that the voices do not move at the same time.

History
Voice leading developed as an independent concept when Heinrich Schenker stressed its importance in "free counterpoint", as opposed to strict counterpoint. He wrote:

Schenker indeed did not present the rules of voice leading merely as contrapuntal rules, but showed how they are inseparable from the rules of harmony and how they form one of the most essential aspects of musical composition. (See Schenkerian analysis: voice leading.)

Common-practice conventions and pedagogy

Chord connection 

Western musicians have tended to teach voice leading by focusing on connecting adjacent harmonies because that skill is foundational to meeting larger, structural objectives.
Common-practice conventions dictate that melodic lines should be smooth and independent. To be independent, they should avoid parallel fifths and octaves.

Contrapuntal conventions likewise consider permitted or forbidden melodic intervals in individual parts, intervals between parts, the direction of the movement of the voices with respect to each other, etc. Whether dealing with counterpoint or harmony, these conventions emerge not only from a desire to create easy-to-sing parts but also from the constraints of tonal materials and from the objectives behind writing certain textures.

These conventions are discussed in more detail below.

Harmonic roles

As the Renaissance gave way to the Baroque era in the 1600s, part writing reflected the increasing stratification of harmonic roles. This differentiation between outer and inner voices was an outgrowth of both tonality and homophony. In this new Baroque style, the outer voices took a commanding role in determining the flow of the music and tended to move more often by leaps. Inner voices tended to move stepwise or repeat common tones.

A Schenkerian analysis perspective on these roles shifts the discussion somewhat from "outer and inner voices" to "upper and bass voices." Although the outer voices still play the dominant, form-defining role in this view, the leading soprano voice is often seen as a composite line that draws on the voice leadings in each of the upper voices of the imaginary continuo. Approaching harmony from a non-Schenkerian perspective, Dmitri Tymoczko nonetheless also demonstrates such "3+1" voice leading, where "three voices articulate a strongly crossing-free voice leading between complete triads [...], while a fourth voice adds doublings," as a feature of tonal writing.

Neo-Riemannian theory examines another facet of this principle. That theory decomposes movements from one chord to another into one or several "parsimonious movements"  between pitch classes instead of actual pitches (i.e., neglecting octave shifts). Such analysis shows the deeper continuity underneath surface disjunctions, as in the Bach example from BWV 941 hereby.

References

Further reading
 McAdams, S. and Bregman, A. (1979). "Hearing musical streams", in Computer Music Journal 3(4): 26–44 and in Roads, C. and Strawn, J., eds. (1985). Foundations of Computer Music, p. 658–698. Cambridge, Massachusetts: MIT Press.
 "Voice Leading Overview", Harmony.org.uk.
 Voice Leading: The Science Behind a Musical Art by David Huron, 2016, MIT Press
 "Mathematical Musick – The Contrapuntal Formula of Dr. Thomas Campion" by Jeff Lee, shipbrook.net

 
Arrangement
Tonality
Schenkerian analysis